Scott Usher (born April 27, 1983) is an American former competition swimmer who represented the United States at the 2004 Summer Olympics in Athens, Greece.  He swam for Grand Island Senior High in high school.  Usher advanced to the finals of the men's 200-meter breaststroke, and finished seventh overall with a time of 2:11.95.

See also
 List of University of Wyoming alumni

References

External links
 
 
 

1983 births
Living people
American male breaststroke swimmers
Medalists at the FINA World Swimming Championships (25 m)
Olympic swimmers of the United States
People from Nance County, Nebraska
Swimmers at the 2004 Summer Olympics
Wyoming Cowboys swimmers